Futurepop is an electronic music genre that has been characterized as a blend of synthpop, EBM and dance beats, based on trance and techno. 

It developed in Western Europe as an outgrowth of both EBM and electro-industrial music cultures and it began to emerge in the late 1990s with artists like VNV Nation, Covenant, and Apoptygma Berzerk. Other leading genre artists were Assemblage 23, Icon of Coil, Neuroticfish, and Rotersand.<ref name="Elferen">Isabella van Elferen: Gothic Music: The Sounds of the Uncanny, University of Wales Press, 2012, p. 165.</ref>

Futurepop is mostly associated with the cybergoth subculture.  It  has become popular in alternative dance clubs, particularly in Germany. Music festivals that feature futurepop bands include Infest, Amphi festival, Wave Gotik Treffen and M'era Luna.

Characteristics
Futurepop is mainly characterized by its "technoid" and "dance-oriented" pop music structures, catchy melodies, the "pervasive use of trance beats" ), and an absence of vocal modification. The genre is distinguished from regular trance music by "retaining the lyrical and vocal structure of synthpop". Its "transparent sounds" and "smooth production" style have been considered as being "chart-compatible" and "designed for music clubs".Alexander Nym: Schillerndes Dunkel: Geschichte, Entwicklung und Themen der Gothic-Szene. Plöttner Verlag, 2010, p. 199."In der Szene ist Neon das neue Schwarz. Der Sound dazu nennt sich Future Pop, Cybergoth oder Hellectro und ist von billigem Techno oft kaum mehr zu unterscheiden. (Stefan Gnad).("Within the dark scene neon is the new black. The sound connected to it is called futurepop, cybergoth or hellectro. The music shows almsost no difference to mediocrely produced techno music.").

Tom Shear of Assemblage 23 described the style ironically as "mostly people who can't sing over '90s era trance patches".

Etymology
Ronan Harris of VNV Nation credited himself with the term "futurepop" during a discussion with Apoptygma Berzerk vocalist Stephan Groth to describe the sounds of their music and similar groups at the time. According to Sorted Magazine'' writer "Girl the Bourgeois Individualist":

References

 
Electropop
Electronic body music
Trance music
Electronic dance music genres